The Velir  were a royal house of minor dynastic kings and aristocratic chieftains in Tamilakam in the early historic period of South India. They had close relations with Chera, Chola and Pandya rulers through ruling and coronation rights. Sangam literature and inscriptions claim that they belong to the Kshatriya dynasty of Yadu (legendary king).

Origin

According to the Tholkappiyam, the earliest work of Tamil literature, eighteen clans of the Velirs came from the city of Tuvarapati  under the leadership of the sage Agastya. The legend goes that all the gods and sages went to the Himalayas to attend the marriage of Siva with Parvati due to which the earth started tilting to one side. Agastya was then requested to proceed south to restore the balance. On his way south, Agastya married Lopamudra and is said to have brought with him sage Jamadagni's son Trnadhumagni or Tholkappiyar, the author of Tamil grammar, and eighteen members of the Vrishni family along with eighteen crore Velir and Aruvalar. It has been suggested by some like Thapar and Champakalakshmi, that the ancestors of the Velir may have been related to the Yadava of Dvaraka and the inhabitants of the post Harappan Chacolithic Black and Red ware sites. According to Thapar, the Yadava may have belonged to a non Indo-Aryan language group. They eventually reached Tamraparni, and as the Velir-Perumakan group, cultivated its ancient civilisation as a political, sociocultural and economic structure in South India and Sri Lanka.

The Irunkōvēl kings trace their lineage to the clan of Krishna; one of the inscriptions at Kodumbalur belonging to one of the kings in the Irunkovel line, namely Tennavan Irunkōvēl, declares that he belonged to the Kshatriya dynasty which is descended from Yadu (legendary king). The Moovar Koil record of Irukkuvel chief Boothi Vikramakesari lauds his father, Samarabirama, as Yadu-vamsa-ketu (Banner of the Yadu race). Historians consider the Ay velirs originated from the pastoralists of Ayars and they gained preeminence at an early stage in Tamil history.

History
The Velir were prominent in the Sangam period of Tamil polity, economy, and society. They are traced to the Yadavas (Yadu descent) of Dvaraka and linked up with all important dynasties of South India including the Chalukyas, Hoysalas, and Andhras. In Sangam literature, they are portrayed as independent chieftains who ruled in bordering areas of three major ruling dynasties, had considerable collective power and marriage alliances with Three Crowned Kings. "Karmandala sathakam" a 12th-century work states that the Velirs (The eighteen groups of Vellalar) who ruled Karmandalam (Regions of Southern Karnataka and North Tamil Nadu) were branched-off from:

Haihayas
Kadambas
Nulambas
Vaidhumbas
Dhandakas
Satavahanas
Kalachuris
Pallavas
Andhras
Kunthalas
Dhayanas
Yadhavas
Hoysalas
Rashtrakutas
Chalukyas 
Banas
Moryas
Thondayars

While most of the rulers are substantiated by epigraphs and literatures, some of their history of ruling some dynasties is not recorded.

Also, some of the medieval dynasties of the western half of the peninsula claim to be descended from Yadhavas lineage and the Ay chiefs of Ay dynasty of the ninth century A.D. claim to be the Vrishni-kula as also the Mushika kings who link themselves with Haihaya origins. The Periya Puranam describes about a Haiheya clan king Eyarkon Kalikama Nayanar, he was a Vellalar saint and Commander-in-chief of the Chola army. The Ay velir chieftains, who settled down in Ay county (near Kanyakumari), were quite prominent in Tamil Nadu during the sangam age.

The Chalukyas and Kadambas belonging to Manavya gotra as being the descendants of the original ancestress Hariti. The Karmandala Satakam states that the Velirs of karmandalam belong to the same "Manavya" Gotra. The Chalukya kings were called Velpularasar and Velkulattarasar by some communities, that is kings over Vel country (pula means region or country). Later day references to them in Choļa inscriptions puts the Chalukyas under the Velir community ruling in Deccan.

The Ay Vels were one such Velir group that ruled the territory in and around Venad during the Sangam period. The word Venad is derived from Vel -nadu, that is the country ruled by Vel chieftains. We know of a queen of Vikramaditya Varaguna, an Ay king of 9th century who is referred to as Murugan Chenthi and as Aykula Mahadevi from inscriptions. Her father, an Ay chief called Chathan Murugan is described as a Vennir Vellala that is a Vellala by birth, in the Huzur plates of king Karunandakkan, the predecessor of Vikramaditya Varaguna.

The Irunkōvēl lines of Velir kings are considered to be of the same stock as the Hoysalas as in one of the Sangam poems, the ancestor of the Irungovel chieftain is said to have ruled the fortified city of Tuvarai. This city is identified with the Hoysala capital Dwarasamudra by some historians. Also, the legend of the chief killing a tiger (Pulikadimal) has a striking resemblance to the origin legend of the Hoysalas where ‘'sala'’ kills the tiger to save a sage. As per historian Arokiaswami, the Hoysala title ‘'Ballala'’ is only a variant of the Tamil word ‘'Vellala'’. The Hoysala king Veera Ballala III is even now locally known as the ‘'Vellala Maharaja'’ in Thiruvannamalai, the town that served as their capital in 14th century.

The Irungovel chieftains were related to the Cholas through  matrimony. These princes assumed both the Chola and Irungovel titles like for example there was one Adavallan Gangaikonda Cholan alias Irungolan during the time of Kulottunga I and then there was a certain Sendamangalam Udaiyan Araiyan Edirili Cholan alias Irungolan during the reign of Kulottunga III.

Velir chiefs

Athiyamān Nedumān Añci and his son Ezhini, were Athiyamān chieftains, based in Tagadur (present day village located in Dharmapuri district). They were contemporaries of Auvaiyar. The Sangam poem "Thagadur yathirai", now lost, was written about his battle with the Chera king. Another Velir was Irunkōvēl who ruled over Konaadu, the area in and around Pudukottai, with their capital in Kodumbalur. Nannan was another Velir chieftain who hailed from Tulu Nadu. Yet another Velir chief was Pekan of the Vel Avi family who ruled over Pothini, the modern Palani near Madurai. Other ancient Velir chiefs of repute include Alumbil Vel, Alandur Vel, Ilanji Vel and Nangur Vel.

See also 
History of Tamil Nadu
Ay dynasty
Agastya

References

Tamil history
History of Kerala
History of Tamil Nadu
Sri Lankan Tamil history